¿Quién dijo Detox? is a 2022 Peruvian comedy film written and directed by Rosa María Santisteban (in her directorial debut). Starring Luciana Blomberg, Jimena Lindo, Korina Rivadeneira, Maju Mantilla, Gachi Rivero, Andres Vilchez, Francisco Andrade and Ximena Rodriguez.

Synopsis 
Connie wants to win an account at the law firm where she works, so she will accept a bet that will lead her to expose her life on social networks.

Cast 
The actors participating in this film are:

 Luciana Blomberg as Connie Garcia
 Francisco Andrade as Guille
 Jose Dammert as Tito
 Maria Julia Mantilla Garcia as Tati
 Jimena Lindo as Romina Fermor
 Korina Rivadeneira as Camucha De Romaña
 Andres Vilchez as Salvador

Release 
The film premiered on March 10, 2022 in Peruvian theaters.

References

External links 

 

2022 films
2022 comedy films
Peruvian comedy films
Tondero Producciones films
2020s Peruvian films
2020s Spanish-language films
Films set in Peru
Films shot in Peru
Films about lawyers
2022 directorial debut films